Hay Mucho Rock'n Roll is a compilation series by Spanish rock band Platero y Tú. Most of the songs are re-recorded and remastered due to the low quality audio in previous releases.

Volumen 1

Volumen 2

Resumen Edition

References

External links 
 Platero y Tú official website (in Spanish)

Platero y Tú albums
Spanish-language compilation albums